ARQ or Arq may refer to:
Automatic Repeat-reQuest, an error control mechanism for data transmission
An admission request in H.323 Registration, Admission and Status (RAS) messages
ARQ (film), a 2016 American film
ARQ (journal), an architecture journal
ISO 639-3 code for Algerian Arabic
 ARQ, a query engine for Jena

See also
 Arc (disambiguation)
 ARC (disambiguation)